The following lists events that happened during 1964 in Laos.

Incumbents
Monarch: Savang Vatthana 
Prime Minister: Souvanna Phouma

Events

January
January - The Battle of Lak Sao ends.

July
19-29 July - Operation Triangle

References

 
1960s in Laos
Years of the 20th century in Laos
Laos
Laos